Elsi Maria Hetemäki-Olander (née Rinne; born 26 September 1927 in Oulainen) is a Finnish secondary school teacher and politician. She was a member of the Parliament of Finland from 1970 to 1991, representing the National Coalition Party.

References

1927 births
Living people
People from Oulainen
National Coalition Party politicians
Members of the Parliament of Finland (1970–72)
Members of the Parliament of Finland (1972–75)
Members of the Parliament of Finland (1975–79)
Members of the Parliament of Finland (1979–83)
Members of the Parliament of Finland (1983–87)
Members of the Parliament of Finland (1987–91)
University of Helsinki alumni